The Ordos Dongsheng Stadium is a multi-purpose stadium in Ordos, China.  It is currently used mostly for football matches.  The stadium holds 35,107 spectators.  It opened in 2011. It hosted the 2012 Miss World Pageant, on August 18, 2012.

References

Football venues in China
Multi-purpose stadiums in China
Retractable-roof stadiums
Sports venues in Inner Mongolia